James Battin may refer to:

James F. Battin (1925–1996), American politician from Montana, father of Jim Battin
Jim Battin (born 1962), American politician from California, son of James Franklin Battin

See also
James Batten (1936–1995), American journalist and publisher